The B-Suite is the debut album of French electro artist Krazy Baldhead. The album is split into four "movements" which have from three to five parts.

Track listing 

 1st Movement 
 Part 1 – 4:10
 Part 2 – 2:19
 Part 3 – 1:57
 Part 4 – 3:24
 2nd Movement 
Part 1 – 2:55
Part 2 (aka "Time") (featuring Tes) – 2:15
Part 3 – 1:40
Part 4 – 4:05
 3rd Movement 
Part 1 (aka "Katana Powa") (featuring Big-O and Yulia) – 3:34
Part 2 – 3:38
Part 3 (aka "Sweet Night")  (featuring Outlines) - 4:43
 4th Movement 
Part 1 – 1:37
Part 2 (aka "Saturnication") – 3:49
Part 3 – 1:53
Part 4 – 2:26
Part 5 (aka "The End") (featuring Beat Assailant) – 4:08

References

External links
 

2009 debut albums